Hexed is a 1993 American black romantic comedy film starring Arye Gross, Claudia Christian, Adrienne Shelly, and R. Lee Ermey, and written and directed by Alan Spencer. The film centers on a nebbish hotel clerk who is also a pathological liar that falls in love with a supermodel, unaware that she is a psychotic murderess and escaped mental patient. The movie was filmed in Dallas and Fort Worth.

Plot
A socially awkward clerk, who is also a pathological liar, falls in love with a supermodel who happens to be visiting the hotel in which he works, unaware that she is also a pathological liar and a psychotic murderer.

Cast
 Arye Gross as Matthew "Matt" Welsh
 Claudia Christian as Helen "Hexina" Spears
 Adrienne Shelly as Gloria O'Connor
 R. Lee Ermey as Det. Ferguson
 Ray Baker as Victor Thummell
 Michael E. Knight as Simon Littlefield
 Robin Curtis as Rebecca
 Norman Fell as Herschel Levine

Development
Sony Entertainment made an overall deal with Alan Spencer in 1991 with an emphasis on television, but Spencer wanted to try his hand at features.  As part of the deal, Sony acquired a screenplay penned by Spencer from Weintraub Entertainment Group entitled Shattered Nerves.  Spencer was attached to direct.

Reception
 Not included in this score are original positive reviews or revised opinions from a subsequent DVD release.
Marketed as a parody, Hexed drew harsh reviews, but also occasional positive notices.
Owen Glieberman of Entertainment Weekly gave it a grade D-., but Jeff Mennel in the Hollywood Reporter wrote:  "’Hexed’ is a little bit ‘Airplane’ and a touch of ‘High Anxiety,’ but it's all Alan Spencer.  Spencer has concocted a fun, offbeat, uneven murder comedy that is stop-and-go in its delivery... ‘Hexed’ certainly has its share of narrative flaws, but they're worth putting up with for the wealth of laughter."
Movie Guide said, "HEXED is an occasionally funny parody of erotic thrillers (BASIC INSTINCT, 9 1/2 WEEKS & FATAL ATTRACTION) that goes too far."

References

External links
 
 

1993 films
1990s English-language films
1990s sex comedy films
1990s parody films
1990s erotic thriller films
American satirical films
American comedy thriller films
American black comedy films
American sex comedy films
American erotic thriller films
American independent films
Columbia Pictures films
1993 independent films
1990s satirical films
1990s American films